Hawra can refer to:
Hawra a place in Eritrea located at 
Hawra', a town in Yemen
Hawara, an Egyptian archaeological site
Houri, women in paradise in Islam